John Alexander Sullivan (15 August 1879 – 11 August 1952) was a Conservative member of the House of Commons of Canada. He was born in Beauharnois, Quebec and became a lawyer.

Sullivan attended schools at Valleyfield, Quebec and at Montreal. He became president of Sullivan Gold Mines Ltd. and was the vice-president of the Bar of Montreal at one point.

He was first elected to Parliament at the St. Ann riding in the 1930 general election after unsuccessful campaigns at the Châteauguay—Huntingdon riding in 1925 and 1926. After serving only one term in the House of Commons, Sullivan did not seek re-election in 1935.

References

External links
 

1879 births
1952 deaths
Conservative Party of Canada (1867–1942) MPs
Lawyers in Quebec
Members of the House of Commons of Canada from Quebec
People from Beauharnois, Quebec